is a passenger railway station located in the city of  Kasai, Hyōgo Prefecture, Japan, operated by the third-sector Hōjō Railway Company.

Lines
Abiki Station is served by the Hōjō Line and is 3.5 kilometers from the terminus of the line at Ao Station.

Station layout
The station consists of one side platform serving a single bi-directional track. The station is unattended.

Adjacent stations

History
Abiki Station opened on March 3, 1915. The station building was destroyed in June 1984 in an act of arson. The current station building was completed in February 2013.

Passenger statistics
In fiscal 2018, the station was used by an average of 55 passengers daily.

Surrounding area
 Kasai Minami Industrial Park.

See also
List of railway stations in Japan

References

External links
 
  

Railway stations in Hyōgo Prefecture
Railway stations in Japan opened in 1915
Kasai, Hyōgo